The province of Lampung in Indonesia is divided into regencies which in turn are divided administratively into districts or kecamatan.

Districts 
The districts of Lampung, with the regency each falls into, are as follows:

Abung Barat, Lampung Utara
Abung Selatan, Lampung Utara
Abung Semuli, Lampung Utara
Abung Surakarta, Lampung Utara
Abung Tengah, Lampung Utara
Abung Timur, Lampung Utara
Abung Tinggi, Lampung Utara
Adi Luwih, Pringsewu
Anak Tuha, Lampung Tengah
Bahuga, Way Kanan
Balik Bukit, Lampung Barat
Bandar Mataram, Lampung Tengah
Bandar Sribawono, Lampung Timur
Bandar Surabaya, Lampung Tengah
Bangunrejo, Lampung Tengah
Banjar Agung, Tulang Bawang
Banjar Baru, Tulang Bawang
Banjar Margo, Tulang Bawang
Banjit, Way Kanan
Baradatu, Way Kanan
Batanghari Nuban, Lampung Timur
Batanghari, Lampung Timur
Batu Brak, Lampung Barat
Bekri, Lampung Tengah
Belalau, Lampung Barat
Bengkunat, Lampung Barat
Blambangan Umpu, Way Kanan
Braja Slebah, Lampung Timur
Buay Bahuga, Way Kanan
Bukit Kemuning, Lampung Utara
Bumi Agung, Lampung Timur
Bumi Agung, Way Kanan
Bumi Nabung, Lampung Tengah
Bumi Ratu Nuban, Lampung Tengah
Bunga Mayang, Lampung Utara
Candipuro, Lampung Selatan
Cukuh Balak, Tanggamus
Dente Teladas, Tulang Bawang
Gading Rejo, Pringsewu
Gedong Tataan, Pesawaran
Gedung Aji Baru, Tulang Bawang
Gedung Aji, Tulang Bawang
Gedung Meneng, Tulang Bawang
Gisting, Tanggamus
Gunung Agung, Tulang Bawang Barat
Gunung Labuhan, Way Kanan
Gunung Pelindung, Lampung Timur
Gunung Sugih, Lampung Tengah
Gunung Terang, Tulang Bawang Barat
Jabung, Lampung Timur
Jati Agung, Lampung Selatan
Kalianda, Lampung Selatan
Kalirejo, Lampung Tengah
Karya Penggawa, Lampung Barat
Kasui, Way Kanan
Katibung, Lampung Selatan
Kedaton, Bandar Lampung
Kedondong, Pesawaran
Kelumbayan, Tanggamus
Kemiling, Bandar Lampung
Ketapang, Lampung Selatan
Ketimbang
Kota Agung, Tanggamus
Kota Gajah, Lampung Tengah
Kotabumi Selatan, Lampung Utara
Kotabumi Utara, Lampung Utara
Kotabumi, Lampung Utara
Labuhan Maringgai, Lampung Timur
Labuhan Ratu, Lampung Timur
Lambu Kibang, Tulang Bawang Barat
Lemong, Lampung Barat
Margatiga, Lampung Timur
Marga Sekampung, Lampung Timur
Mataram Baru, Lampung Timur
Melinting, Lampung Timur
Menggala, Tulang Bawang
Menggala Timur, Tulang Bawang
Meraksa Aji, Tulang Bawang
Merbau Mataram, Lampung Selatan
Mesuji, Mesuji
Metro Barat, Kota Metro
Metro Barat, Metro
Metro Kibang, Lampung Timur
Metro Pusat, Metro
Metro Selatan, Metro
Metro Timur, Metro
Metro Utara, Metro
Muara Sungkai, Lampung Utara
Natar, Lampung Selatan
Negara Batin, Way Kanan
Negeri Agung, Way Kanan
Negeri Besar, Way Kanan
Negeri Katon, Pesawaran
Padang Cermin, Pesawaran
Padang Ratu, Lampung Tengah
Pagelaran, Pringsewu
Pakuan Ratu, Way Kanan
Palas, Lampung Selatan
Panjang, Bandar Lampung
Pardasuka, Pringsewu
Pasir Sakti, Lampung Timur
Pekalongan, Lampung Timur
Pematang Sawa, Tanggamus
Penawar Aji, Tulang Bawang
Penawar Tama, Tulang Bawang
Penengahan, Lampung Selatan
Pesisir Selatan, Lampung Barat
Pesisir Tengah, Lampung Barat
Pesisir Utara, Lampung Barat
Pubian, Lampung Tengah
Pugung, Tanggamus
Pulau Panggung, Tanggamus
Punduh Pidada, Pesawaran
Punggur, Lampung Tengah
Purbolinggo, Lampung Timur
Rajabasa, Bandar Lampung
Rajabasa, Lampung Selatan
Raman Utara, Lampung Timur
Rawajitu Selatan, Tulang Bawang
Rawajitu Timur, Tulang Bawang
Rawajitu Utara, Mesuji
Rebang Tangkas, Way Kanan
Rumbia, Lampung Tengah
Sekampung Udik, Lampung Timur
Sekampung, Lampung Timur
Sekincau, Lampung Barat
Selagai Lingga, Lampung Tengah
Semaka, Tanggamus
Sendang Agung, Lampung Tengah
Seputih Agung, Lampung Tengah
Seputih Banyak, Lampung Tengah
Seputih Mataram, Lampung Tengah
Seputih Raman, Lampung Tengah
Seputih Surabaya, Lampung Tengah
Sidomulyo, Lampung Selatan
Simpang Pematang, Mesuji
Sragi, Lampung Selatan
Way Halim, Bandar Lampung
Sukadana, Lampung Timur
Sukarame, Bandar Lampung
Sukau, Lampung Barat
Sukoharjo, Pringsewu
Sumber Jaya, Lampung Barat
Sumberejo, Tanggamus
Sungkai Selatan, Lampung Utara
Sungkai Utara, Lampung Utara
Suoh, Lampung Barat
Talang Padang, Tanggamus
Tanjung Bintang, Lampung Selatan
Tanjung Karang Barat, Bandar Lampung
Tanjung Karang Pusat, Bandar Lampung
Tanjung Karang Timur, Bandar Lampung
Tanjung Raja, Lampung Utara
Tanjung Raya, Mesuji
Tanjung Senang, Bandar Lampung
Tanjungsari, Lampung Selatan
Tegineneng, Pesawaran
Teluk Betung Barat, Bandar Lampung
Teluk Betung Selatan, Bandar Lampung
Teluk Betung Utara, Bandar Lampung
Terbanggi Besar, Lampung Tengah
Terusan Nunyai, Lampung Tengah
Trimurjo, Lampung Tengah
Tulang Bawang Tengah, Tulang Bawang Barat
Tulang Bawang Udik, Tulang Bawang Barat
Tumi Jajar, Tulang Bawang Barat
Ulubelu, Tanggamus
Waway Karya, Lampung Timur
Way Bungur, Lampung Timur
Way Jepara, Lampung Timur
Way Kenanga, Tulang Bawang Barat
Way Lima, Pesawaran
Way Panji, Lampung Selatan
Way Pengubuan, Lampung Tengah
Way Ratai, Pesawaran
Way Seputih, Lampung Tengah
Way Serdang, Mesuji
Way Sulan, Lampung Selatan
Way Tenong, Lampung Barat
Way Tuba, Way Kanan
Wonosobo, Tanggamus
Air Itam, Lampung Barat
Gedung Surian, Lampung Barat
Kebun Tebu, Lampung Barat
Bandar Negeri Suoh, Lampung Barat
Pagar Dewa Lampung Barat
Batu Ketulis, Lampung Barat
Gedung Surian' Lampung Barat

References

 
Lampung
Politics of Indonesia